Hlavní nádraží is a Prague Metro station on Line C. The metro station serves Praha hlavní nádraží, Prague's principal mainline railway station. The metro station is situated underground, below the railway station.

History
Hlavní nádraží is one of the oldest stations on the Prague Metro network. It was originally designed for underground trams and construction was started in 1966. The project was changed later to metro trains, but the station was almost complete. The station was opened on May 9, 1974, with the first section of Prague Metro, between Sokolovská and Kačerov.

References

External links 

 Gallery and information 

Prague Metro stations
Railway stations opened in 1974
1974 establishments in Czechoslovakia
Railway stations in the Czech Republic opened in the 20th century